Sirous Ranjbar (born September 21, 1963 in Tehran, Iran) is an Iranian filmmaker.

Biography
Sirous Ranjbar (Cyrus Ranjbar) graduated from IRIB University in film production (Bachelor's degree) and Philosophy of Law from Tehran University (Master's degree). He began his artistic activities as assistant director in Ahmad Moradpoor's The Altar Of Fire (1992) and Parviz Shahbazi's The Traveller from the South (1995). Screenwriter of various short and feature films and TV series. Call Of Gabriel is his debut feature. He has worked for many years as an editor and headeditor at the Fictional Magazine, the two-volume “Surah for Youth,” as well as the Office of Islamic Revolution Literature and the Office of Sacred Defense Literature. He has been working with the Farabi Cinema Foundation as a scriptwriter for twenty years.

 Member of the Iranian Cinema Directors Guild
 Member of the Iranian Cinema Screenwriters Guild
 Member of the Association of Iranian Cinema Companies and Producers
 Member of Iran Chamber of Commerce, Industries, Mines & Agriculture - Tehran

Director
 Grandpa Inheritance, 2022 (pre-production)
 EGLANTAIN, 2022 (pre-production)
 The Hustlers, 2020 (Confiscated)
 FARANGIS, 2015 Documentary
 A Few Alleys Down the Street (Chand Koocheh Paaintar), 2013
 The Autumnal Mother (Madar-e Paeizi), 2012
 Call Of Gabriel (The Sound of Gabriel) (Awa-ye Jebraeil), 2004
 The Little Filmmaker, 1996 [TV Series]
 Vertical Ladder (Nardeban-e Amoodi), 1993 [Short Film]

Screenwriter
 Grandpa Inheritance, 2021-2022 
 The Hustlers, 2018
 Black Scorpion, 2017
 EGLANTINE, 2016
 Sayeh, 2015 Directed By Massoud Nawabi
 The Autumnal Mother (Madar-e Paeizi), 2012 
 Damoon Identity, 2011
 Burden of Begin / A Friend Made of Fire (Doosti Az Jensseh Atash), 2008 Directed By Amir Ghavidel
 Out of Heaven (Biroon Az Behesht), 2006 Directed By Khowsrow Massoumi
 Call Of Gabriel (The Sound of Gabriel) (Awa-ye Jebraeil), 2004
 The Glass Agency (Ajans-e Shisheh-i), 1998 (CoScreenwriter) Directed By Ebrahim Hatamikia
 Diplomat, 1995 Directed By Dariush Farhang

Editor
 Farangis, 2015
 Like Mania (Shabih-e Sheydaei), 2014 Directed By Nasser Pooyesh
 A Few Alleys Down the Street (Chand Koocheh Paaintar), 2013
 Call Of Gabriel (The Sound of Gabriel) (Awa-ye Jebraeil), 2004
 Gesture of Fire (Kereshme-ye Atash), 2003
 Vertical Ladder (Nardeban-e Amoodi), 1993

Producer
 SMUGGLERS, 2022 Documentary (pre-production)
 Sarah's Umbrella, 2021 (Short Film)
 Farangis, 2015 Documentray
 The Autumnal Mother, 2012
 Call Of Gabriel (The Sound of Gabriel) (Awa-ye Jebraeil), 2004
 Gesture of Fire (Kereshme-ye Atash), 2003

Documentary
 Line, 1989
 Fire, 1989
 Gesture of Fire (Kereshme-ye Atash), 2003
 Farangis, 2015

Assistant Director
 Traveler from the South (Mosafere jonoub), 1997 Directed By Parviz Shahbazi
 Fire Prayer Carpet (Sajdadehye Atash), 1995 Directed By Ahmad Moradpour

References 
 https://www.imdb.com.tw/name/nm7508412/?ref_=filmo_li_wr_1
 https://www.imdb.com.tw/filmosearch?sort=num_votes&explore=title_type&role=nm1473580
 http://www.filmfestivals.com/image/cyrus_ranjbar
 http://shahid.ifilmtv.ir/English/Star/446195
 http://www.screendaily.com/70-iranian-features-submitted-for-fajr-international-film-festival/4011808.article
 BFI
 http://www.film-international.com/news/news.asp?id=35
 http://www.sourehcinema.com/People/People.aspx?Id=138112050014%7C
 https://www.youtube.com/watch?v=K6zJG_w4YwE
 http://www.ifilmtv.com/English/Serie/462/#.VljAOGQnt68
 http://www.telewebion.com/en/48133/A-Few-Alleys-Down-the-Street.html
 :fa:سیروس رنجبر
 https://www.facebook.com/Cyrus.Ranjbar
 http://www.taorminafilmfest.it/2005/english/cinemadelmondo/scheda.asp?ID=9
 :fa:آوای جبرئیل
 http://www.sourehcinema.com/Title/Title.aspx?id=138109262127
 http://www.fcf.ir/en/movies/an-autumnal-mother
 http://www.fcf.ir/en/movies?start=30
http://www.whatsupiran.com/Movie/Madare-Paeezi
 :fa:مادر پاییزی
 http://www.sourehcinema.com/Title/Title.aspx?id=139003070000
 :fa:دیپلمات (فیلم)
 http://www.ifilmtv.ir/Farsi/Serie/219/
 http://tisff.ir/index.php?option=com_content&view=article&id=325&catid=78&lang=fa
 :fa:بیرون از بهشت
 http://www.sourehpictures.com/view.php?id=17
 https://www.youtube.com/watch?v=ATjICU__vgE

1963 births
Living people
Iranian film directors